A Colombian necktie (tie-cut) is a form of post-mortem mutilation in which the victim’s tongue is pulled through a deep cut beneath the jaw and left dangling on the neck. It first appeared in Colombia during the period known as La Violencia (1948–1958) as a method of psychological warfare designed to scare and intimidate. It was one of several documented types of public mutilation in the conflict used to terrorize people away from their land. Others included killing a pregnant woman, extracting the fetus and placing it on her body and replacing it with a rooster; stuffing the genitals of dead men into their mouths; and the "flower-vase-cut" where the victim's limbs were cut off and stuffed into their torso. The methods served to dehumanize victims, as can be seen in terms used by perpetrators such as bocachiquear and picar para tamal, which refer respectively to the preparation of fish and tamales.

Its invention is sometimes erroneously attributed to drug kingpin Pablo Escobar. It is commonly referenced in popular culture and pulp fiction, although there is no verifiable evidence of it having occurred in the United States and its purported usage by domestic drug dealers is likely an urban legend. During the O. J. Simpson murder case, defense lawyers claimed that hitmen hired by drug dealers gave Nicole Brown Simpson a Colombian necktie, but this was barred from testimony for not having supporting evidence.

See also
 Glasgow smile
 Necklacing

References

External links 
 

Execution methods
La Violencia